The One Million Pound Note (Hungarian: Az egymillió fontos bankó) is a 1916 Hungarian silent comedy film directed by Alexander Korda and starring Lajos Ujváry, Gyula Nagy and Aladár Ihász. It is an adaptation of Mark Twain's 1893 short story The Million Pound Bank Note.

Cast
Lajos Ujváry
Gyula Nagy
Aladár Ihász

References

Bibliography

External links

Hungarian silent films
Hungarian comedy films
Films directed by Alexander Korda
Films based on works by Mark Twain
Films based on short fiction
Hungarian black-and-white films
Austro-Hungarian films
1916 comedy films